Hugues Sweeney is head of French-language interactive media production at the National Film Board of Canada, based in Montreal. Sweeney's recent credits include My Tribe Is My Life, the online interactive animation work, Bla Bla, Rouge au carré, an interactive work about the 2012 Quebec student protests, as well as the 2013 production A Journal of Insomnia, a webdoc about insomnia which was originally conceived by Sweeney in the summer of 2009, when he and his wife were up nights due to the irregular sleep patterns of their newborn daughter.

In 2012, he was president of the jury of the 18th edition of the Concours Boomerang, honouring the best advertising and interactive websites by Quebec companies.

From 2000 to 2007, he headed Radio Canada's Bande à part  multi-platform project. He studied philosophy at the Dominican College of Philosophy and Theology in Ottawa and multimedia at Université du Québec à Montréal.

References

External links
 La programmation numérique à l'ONF / Entretien avec Hugues Sweeney, interview, NFB.ca blog (in French)

National Film Board of Canada people
Web designers
French Quebecers
Living people
Year of birth missing (living people)
New media artists
Artists from Montreal
Université du Québec à Montréal alumni
Canadian Broadcasting Corporation people